New Garden Township may refer to the following townships in the United States:

 New Garden Township, Wayne County, Indiana
 New Garden Township, Chester County, Pennsylvania